Safari Off Road Adventure is a safari attraction currently operating at Six Flags Great Adventure in Jackson Township, New Jersey. It replaced the former Six Flags Wild Safari drive-through safari park, which closed on September 30, 2012, in order for it to become its own standalone ride experience.

Owing to the COVID-19 pandemic in 2020, the attraction has returned to being a drive-through experience for private vehicles, with tickets that can be bought separately from the main park.

History

When Warner LeRoy was proposing the Great Adventure park, his original proposal was to include a drive-thru safari. The planned drive-thru was to have 45 tigers, 25 cheetahs and pumas, 100 brown, black, and polar bears, 50 giraffes, 60 zebras, 250 antelope, 250 baboons and other monkeys, 40 elephants, 20 rhinos, 25 camels, 100 ostriches, kudu, hartebeest, wildebeest, deer, kangaroo, wild goat, wild sheep, cranes, flamingoes, vultures, hornbills, buffalo, moose, elk and others. It was to also have 10 miles of road. Though it was never realized, some of the park's animals from the proposal appeared in the park in a slightly different form.

Wild Safari was opened to the public on July 4, 1974, along with its theme park neighbor, Great Adventure.

On August 20, 2012, Six Flags announced that the park would be closed to private vehicles from September 30, 2012, and that the animals would remain in the preserve. On August 30, 2012, Six Flags announced that they would open the Safari Off Road Adventure in 2013. Following Wild Safari's closure on September 30, 2012, construction began to renovate it to become the Safari Off Road Adventure. Safari Off Road Adventure opened May 25, 2013.

In March 2020, Six Flags suspended all operations across all their properties due to the COVID-19 pandemic. During the continuation of the pandemic in May, Six Flags Great Adventure announced that they plan on reopening the first Six Flags attraction, Safari Off Road Adventure, while keeping the rest of the park closed. This comes after the Governor of New Jersey signed an executive order to allow drive-thru venues to resume operations on May 13. Safari Off Road Adventure reopened on May 30, with the attraction going back to its historic routes and becoming once again a drive-through safari. A month later, Six Flags Great Adventure announced their new opening date for the season on July 3, 2020. Plans were in place for Safari Off Road Adventure to return with the theme park operations, but park officials stated that the safari will continue its own operations, due to the popularity and the ability for guest to continue social distancing while in their own vehicles.

Overview
It contained 11 themed sections, and was a home to 1200 animals from six different continents. The park also added an up-charge zip line attraction.

Since its renovation, Safari Off Road Adventure retains the themed areas from Wild Safari. Additionally, midway through the tour passengers are able to disembark from the vehicles at an area called Camp Aventura. This section of the park contains much of Great Adventure's bird and reptile collection, while also offering guests an opportunity to feed giraffes.

Animals

The Americas
European fallow deer
Roosevelt elk
American bison
Llama
Greater rhea

Afrikka
African bush elephant
Common ostrich
Southern white rhinoceros
Grant's zebra
Asian water buffalo

Wilde Plains
Blackbuck
Common eland
Ellipsis waterbuck
Beisa oryx
Scimitar-horned oryx
Dama gazelle
Indian peafowl
Red Ankole cattle
Reticulated giraffe
White-bearded gnu
Bongo

Serengeti Grasslands
Addax
Sable antelope
White-tailed gnu
Aoudad

Kingsland
African lion

Black Bear Ridge
American black bear

Wilde Plains Lowlands
Chilean flamingo
Red lechwe
Greater kudu
African sacred ibis

Terra Ursus
European brown bear

Conservation Area
White-tailed deer
American red fox
Northern raccoon
Virginia opossum
Eastern box turtle
Red-eared slider
Bald eagle

Didgeridoo Pass
Red kangaroo
Emu

Tigris Asiana
Bengal tiger
Siberian tiger
Nilgai
Yak
Blackbuck
Aoudad

Baboon Village
Olive baboon

See also
 Kilimanjaro Safaris
 Rhino Rally
 Safari park
 2013 in amusement parks

References

External links
Safari Off Road Adventure

Amusement rides introduced in 1974
Amusement rides introduced in 2013
Six Flags Great Adventure
1974 establishments in New Jersey